Ljusnedal is a village and parish in Härjedalen Municipality in Jämtland County, Sweden. Ljusnedal Church (Ljusnedals kyrka) is a  wooden church  built in 1796.  The interior is characterized by renovation conducted during 1902. The altarpiece is painted by the artist Sven   Linnborg  (1857-1932). The church is associated with the Tännäs-Ljusnedal parish in the Diocese of Härnösand.

Climate

References 

Populated places in Härjedalen Municipality
Härjedalen